1993 ACC tournament may refer to:

 1993 ACC men's basketball tournament
 1993 ACC women's basketball tournament
 1993 ACC men's soccer tournament
 1993 ACC women's soccer tournament
 1993 Atlantic Coast Conference baseball tournament
 1993 Atlantic Coast Conference softball tournament